Jimmy Campbell may refer to:

 Jimmy Campbell (footballer, born 1886) (1886–1925), Scottish footballer
 Jimmy Campbell (footballer, born 1918) (1918–2011), Scottish footballer
 Jimmy Campbell (footballer, born 1921) (1921–2004), Scottish footballer
 Jimmy Campbell (footballer, born 1937) (1937–1994), English footballer
 Jimmy Campbell (fiddler) (1937–2022), Irish musician
 Jimmy Campbell (musician) (1944–2007), English singer-songwriter
 Jimmy Campbell (songwriter), British songwriter and music publisher, known for his collaborations with Reg Connelly
 Jimmy Campbell (bowls), Canadian lawn bowls international

See also
 James Campbell (disambiguation)
 Jim Campbell (disambiguation)